The Archduke Leopold Wilhelm in his Painting Gallery in Brussels is a 1651 painting of Archduke Leopold Wilhelm's Italian art collection by the Flemish Baroque painter David Teniers the Younger, now held in the Prado in Madrid.

Description 
The painting shows the Archduke as a collector with friends admiring a set of paintings. The artist himself is standing at a table inspecting engravings. The paintings are arranged in rows on rear walls, with more visible through a central doorway, and a set that are positioned in the foreground leaning against chairs for inspection.

History 
This painting is one of a set that David Teniers the Younger prepared to document the Archduke's collection before he employed 12 engravers to publish his Theatrum Pictorium, considered the "first illustrated art catalog". He published this book of engravings after the Archduke had moved to Austria and taken his collection with him. It was published in Antwerp in 1659 and again in 1673.

The Archduke commissioned this painting as a gift for Philip IV of Spain, possibly to show off the magnificence of his Brussels gallery after his recent Italian painting acquisitions from the estate sale of the Duke of Hamilton.

List of paintings depicted
The following is a list of the recognizable paintings of the collection, not all of which were included in the Italian catalog prepared by Teniers, which was a selection of 243 of the most prized paintings out of a collection of 1300-1400 pieces. Many are still in the Viennese collection. Here is a list of the paintings depicted, which starts with the paintings on the rear wall, running from left to right and from top to bottom. Next listed are the paintings in the foreground propped against chairs:

References 

 David Teniers and the Theatre of Painting, exhibition 19 October 2006 to 21 January 2007 on website of the Courtauld Institute of Art

1650s paintings
17th-century paintings
Paintings of the Museo del Prado by Flemish artists
Paintings in the collection of the Archduke Leopold Wilhelm of Austria
Paintings of art galleries
Paintings by David Teniers the Younger
Dogs in art